The Blaine Amendment was a failed amendment to the U.S. Constitution that would have prohibited direct government aid to educational institutions that have a religious affiliation. Most state constitutions already had such provisions, and thirty-eight of the fifty states have clauses that prohibit taxpayer funding of religious entities in their state constitutions.

The measures were designed to deny government aid to parochial schools, especially those operated by the Catholic Church in locations with large immigrant populations.  They emerged from a growing consensus among 19th-century U.S. Protestants that public education must be free from “sectarian” or “denominational” control, while it also reflected nativist tendencies hostile to immigrants.

The amendments are generally seen as explicitly anti-Catholic because when they were enacted public schools typically included Protestant prayer, and taught from Protestant bibles, although debates about public funding of sectarian schools predate any significant Catholic immigration to the U.S. Thus, at the time of the Blaine amendments, public schools were not non-sectarian or non-denominational in the modern sense; nor were they completely secular.

Proposed federal amendment
President Ulysses S. Grant (1869–77) in a speech in 1875 to a veterans' meeting, called for a Constitutional amendment that would mandate free public schools and prohibit the use of public money for sectarian schools. He was echoing nativist sentiments that were strong in his Republican Party.

Grant laid out his agenda for "good common school education." He attacked government support for "sectarian schools" run by religious organizations, and called for the defense of public education "unmixed with sectarian, pagan or atheistical dogmas." Grant declared that "Church and State" should be "forever separate". "Religion", he said, "should be left to families, churches, and private schools devoid of public funds."

After Grant's speech, Republican Congressman James G. Blaine proposed the amendment to the federal Constitution. Blaine, who actively sought Catholic votes when he ran for president in 1884, believed that possibility of hurtful agitation on the school question should be ended.   In 1875, the proposed amendment passed by a vote of 180 to 7 in the House of Representatives, but failed by four votes to achieve the necessary two-thirds vote in the United States Senate. It never became federal law.

The proposed text was:

Amendments to state constitutions
Supporters of the proposal then turned their attention to state legislatures, where their efforts met with far greater success. Eventually, all but 12 states (Arkansas, Connecticut, Iowa, Maine, Maryland, New Jersey, North Carolina, Ohio, Rhode Island, Tennessee, Vermont, and West Virginia) passed laws that meet the general criteria for designation as "Blaine amendments," in that they ban the use of public funds to support sectarian private schools. Jonathan A. Greenblatt, chief executive of the Anti-Defamation League, explained in 2017 the purpose of the state constitutional Blaine amendments: “These constitutional provisions serve significant government interests — leaving the support of churches to church members, while also protecting houses of worship against discrimination and interference from the government.” In some states the provisions in question were included in newly drafted constitutions, rather than adopted as amendments to an existing constitution.

The state Blaine amendments remained in effect in thirty seven states until June 2020. In 2012, 56% of voters rejected a measure repealing Florida's Blaine amendment. A 60% favorable margin was required for adoption. Voters have also rejected proposals to repeal their state-level Blaine amendments in New York (1967), Michigan (1970), Oregon (1972), Washington state (1975), Alaska (1976), Massachusetts (1986), and Oklahoma (2016).

On April 20, 1974, voters in Louisiana approved a new constitution by a margin of 58 to 42 percent, which repealed the Blaine amendment that was part of that state's 1921 constitution. Louisiana's current 1974 constitution replaced it with a copy of the federal First Amendment's no-establishment and free exercise clauses, in Article 1, Sec. 8 of its Declaration of Rights; in Article 8, Sec. 13(a), it also guarantees the provision of free textbooks and "materials of instruction" to all children attending elementary and secondary schools in Louisiana.

Two other states, South Carolina and Utah, have also watered down their "no-aid to religion" constitutional clauses by removing from them the word "indirect," leaving only a prohibition of direct aid or assistance to religious schools in these states.

On June 30, 2020, the Supreme Court of the United States ruled in Espinoza v. Montana Department of Revenue that Montana's no-aid provision in its constitution, a Blaine amendment, had been inappropriately used to block tax-credit scholarship funds for private schooling for being used at a religious school in violation of the Free Exercise Clause. The ruling effectively stated that if the state offered public scholarship funds for a private school, they could not discriminate against religious schools. As a result, it is expected that states that have similar programs with no-aid provisions in their constitutions will be forced to re-evaluate any program restrictions.

See also
Public funding of parochial schools
Separation of church and state in the United States
 Trinity Lutheran Church of Columbia, Inc. v. Comer
 Espinoza v. Montana Department of Revenue
 Carson v. Makin

Notes

Further reading
 Deforrest, Mark Edward.  "An Overview and Evaluation of State Blaine Amendments: Origins, Scope, and First Amendment Concerns," Harvard Journal of Law and Public Policy, Vol. 26, 2003 available here 
 Green, Steven K. "The Blaine Amendment Reconsidered," 36 Am. J. Legal Hist. 38 (1992)

External links
The Becket Fund for Religious Liberty A leading opponent of Blaine Amendments in the legal arena
Blaineamendments.org A comprehensive resource by the Becket Fund, which seeks to overturn the amendments
School Choice: The Blaine Amendments & Anti-Catholicism Report by the United States Commission on Civil Rights

Proposed amendments to the United States Constitution
Religion and politics
State law in the United States
History of religion in the United States
1875 in the United States
1875 in religion
1875 in American politics
James G. Blaine
Anti-Catholicism in the United States